Shimizume Dam is a gravity dam located in Aomori Prefecture in Japan. The dam is used for flood control. The catchment area of the dam is 17 km2. The dam impounds about 29  ha of land when full and can store 2630 thousand cubic meters of water. The construction of the dam was started on 1976 and completed in 2000.

References

Dams in Aomori Prefecture
2000 establishments in Japan